Lima Duarte is a municipality in the state of Minas Gerais, Brazil. It was given city status in 1881.

It is connected with this city by highway BR-267.

Average maximum temperature: ;
Average minimum temperature: 

Most of the municipality is drained by the Paraíba do Sul River.  The most important river is the Rio do Peixe, a tributary of the Paraibuna.

The name of the city has no connection to the famous Brazilian actor Lima Duarte, but was in homage to Conselheiro José Rodrigues de Lima Duarte, political leader from Barbacena, who in the nineteenth century was Minister of the Navy and a Senator of the Empire.

The city's economy is mainly based on tourism and the dairy industry.

References

External links

City site 
Ibitipoca state park 

Municipalities in Minas Gerais